Luis Alberto Marco Contreras (born 20 August 1986) is a Spanish middle-distance runner. He specializes in the 800 metres.

Marco was born in Seville. He finished eleventh in the 1500 metres at the 2003 World Youth Championships. In the 800 metres he finished fourth at the 2007 European Indoor Championships and won the silver medal at the 2009 European Indoor Championships.

Marco was a finalist at the 2010 European Championships in Athletics in Barcelona.

His personal best time is 1:45.14 minutes, achieved in June 2012 in Huelva.

Competition record

References

1986 births
Living people
Spanish male middle-distance runners
Athletes (track and field) at the 2012 Summer Olympics
Olympic athletes of Spain